This is a list of British comedy films.

1930s

Boots! Boots! (1934)
Radio Parade of 1935 (1934)
Those Were the Days (1934)
Boys Will Be Boys (1935)
Dandy Dick (1935)
The Ghost Goes West (1935)
No Limit (1935)
Off the Dole (1935)
So You Won't Talk (1935) 
Captain Bill (1936)
Cheer Up (1936)
Educated Evans (1936)
Excuse My Glove (1936)
The Interrupted Honeymoon (1936)
It's Love Again (1936)
Jack of All Trades (1936)
Keep Your Seats, Please (1936)
Laburnum Grove (1936)
Love at Sea (1936)
Love in Exile (1936)
The Man in the Mirror (1936)
The Man Who Could Work Miracles (1936)
Not So Dusty (1936)
Pot Luck (1936)
Public Nuisance No. 1 (1936)
Queen of Hearts (1936)
Radio Lover (1936)
Southern Roses (1936)
Where There's a Will (1936)
Windbag the Sailor (1936)
Aren't Men Beasts! (1937)
Boys Will Be Girls (1937)
Cotton Queen (1937)
The Dominant Sex (1937)
Feather Your Nest (1937)
Good Morning, Boys (1937)
Intimate Relations (1937) 
It's Not Cricket (1937)
Kathleen Mavourneen (1937)
Keep Fit (1937)
Knights for a Day (1937)
O-Kay for Sound (1937)
Oh, Mr Porter! (1937)
Old Mother Riley (1937)
Please Teacher (1937)
The Show Goes On (1937)
Smash and Grab (1937)
Spring Handicap (1937)
Storm in a Teacup (1937)
Take a Chance (1937)
Take My Tip (1937)
You Live and Learn (1937)
A Spot of Bother (1938)
Alf's Button Afloat (1938)
Break the News (1938)
Climbing High (1938)
Convict 99 (1938)
The Divorce of Lady X (1938)
Everything Happens to Me (1938)
Hey! Hey! USA (1938)
Hold My Hand (1938) 
I See Ice (1938)
It's in the Air (1938)
Let's Make a Night of It (1938) 
Night Alone (1938)
Oh Boy! (1938)
Old Bones of the River (1938)
Old Mother Riley in Paris (1938)
Over She Goes (1938)
Owd Bob (1938)
Penny Paradise (1938)
Pygmalion (1938)
Sailing Along (1938)
Save a Little Sunshine (1938) 
The Sky's the Limit (1938)
Sidewalks of London (1938) 
Thank Evans (1938)
Ask a Policeman (1939)
Cheer Boys Cheer (1939)
Come On George! (1939)
The Frozen Limits (1939)
The Gang's All Here (1939)
Home from Home (1939) 
Let's Be Famous (1939)
The Mikado (1939)
The Mysterious Mr. Davis (1939) 
Old Mother Riley, MP (1939)
So This Is London (1939)
Trouble Brewing (1939)
Yes, Madam? (1939) 
Young Man's Fancy (1939)

1940s

Band Waggon (1940)
Charley's (Big-Hearted) Aunt (1940)
Hoots Mon! (1940) 
Jailbirds (1940) 
Law and Disorder (1940) 
Let George Do It! (1940)
The Middle Watch (1940) 
Night Train to Munich (1940) 
Old Mother Riley in Society (1940)
Old Mother Riley Joins Up (1940)
Sailors Don't Care (1940)
Sailors Three (1940) 
Somewhere in England (1940) 
Spare a Copper (1940)
Under Your Hat (1940) 
Where's That Fire? (1940)
Crook's Tour (1941)
Gasbags (1941)
The Ghost of St. Michael's (1941)
The Ghost Train (1941)
Hi Gang! (1941) 
I Thank You (1941) 
Kipps (1941)
Major Barbara (1941)
Old Bill and Son (1941)
Old Mother Riley's Circus (1941)
Old Mother Riley's Ghosts (1941) 
Old Mother Riley in Business (1941) 
Quiet Wedding (1941)
South American George (1941)
Spring Meeting (1941) 
Turned Out Nice Again (1941)
Back-Room Boy (1942)
The Balloon Goes Up (1942)
Banana Ridge (1942) 
The Big Blockade (1942)
The Black Sheep of Whitehall (1942)
Go to Blazes (1942)
The Goose Steps Out (1942)
King Arthur Was a Gentleman (1942) 
Much Too Shy (1942)
Somewhere in Camp (1942)
The Butler's Dilemma (1943) 
Bell-Bottom George (1943)
The Demi-Paradise (1943)
Get Cracking (1943)
It's That Man Again (1943)
Miss London Ltd. (1943)
My Learned Friend (1943)
Old Mother Riley Detective (1943)
Old Mother Riley Overseas (1943) 
Somewhere in Civvies (1943)
Somewhere on Leave (1943)
Up with the Lark (1943)
Women Aren't Angels (1943)
A Canterbury Tale (1944)
Bees in Paradise (1944)
Champagne Charlie (1944) 
Fiddlers Three (1944) 
He Snoops to Conquer (1944)
It's in the Bag (1944) 
On Approval (1944)
One Exciting Night (1944) 
Tawny Pipit (1944) 
This Happy Breed (1944)
Two Thousand Women (1944) 
Blithe Spirit (1945)
Caesar and Cleopatra (1945)
Dreaming (1945) 
Home Sweet Home (1945)
I Didn't Do It (1945)
I Know Where I'm Going! (1945) 
Old Mother Riley at Home (1945)
29 Acacia Avenue (1945)
Demobbed (1946) 
George in Civvy Street (1946)
Here Comes the Sun (1946)
London Town (1946)
Quiet Weekend (1946)
School for Secrets (1946)
An Ideal Husband (1947)
The Ghosts of Berkeley Square (1947)
Holiday Camp (1947)
Hue and Cry (1947)
Just William's Luck (1947)
Things Happen at Night (1947)
A Piece of Cake (1948)
The Brass Monkey (1948)
Easy Money (1948)
Here Come the Huggetts (1948)
Holidays with Pay (1948)
It's Hard to Be Good (1948)
Miranda (1948)
Spring in Park Lane (1948)
Vice Versa (1948) 
When You Come Home (1948)
Woman Hater (1948) 
A Run for Your Money (1949)
Adam and Evelyne (1949)
The Adventures of Jane (1949)
All Over the Town (1949)
The Chiltern Hundreds (1949)
Dear Mr. Prohack (1949)
Don't Ever Leave Me (1949) 
Fools Rush In (1949)
Helter Skelter (1949)
The History of Mr. Polly (1949)
The Huggetts Abroad (1949)
It's Not Cricket (1949)
Kind Hearts and Coronets (1949)
Marry Me! (1949)
Melody (1949)
Old Mother Riley's New Venture (1949)
Passport to Pimlico (1949)
The Perfect Woman (1949)
Poet's Pub (1949)
The Romantic Age (1949)
Saints and Sinners (1949)
School for Randle (1949)
Somewhere in Politics (1949) 
Traveller's Joy (1949) 
Trottie True (1949)
Vote for Huggett (1949)
Warning to Wantons (1949)
Whisky Galore! (1949)

1950s

The Girl Who Couldn't Quite (1950)
The Happiest Days of Your Life (1950)
Her Favourite Husband (1950)
Into the Blue (1950)
Last Holiday (1950)
The Magnet (1950)
Old Mother Riley Headmistress (1950) 
Over the Garden Wall (1950)
Something in the City (1950) 
Appointment with Venus (1951)
Encore (1951)
The Galloping Major (1951)
Happy Go Lovely (1951)
Hotel Sahara (1951) 
Lady Godiva Rides Again (1951)
Laughter in Paradise (1951)
The Lavender Hill Mob (1951)
Let's Go Crazy (1951)
Madame Louise (1951) 
The Man in the White Suit (1951)
Old Mother Riley's Jungle Treasure (1951)
One Wild Oat (1951)
Penny Points to Paradise (1951) 
Talk of a Million (1951) 
Young Wives' Tale (1951)
Brandy for the Parson (1952)
The Card (1952)
Castle in the Air (1952) 
Curtain Up (1952)
Down Among the Z Men (1952)
Father's Doing Fine (1952)
The Happy Family (1952)
His Excellency (1952)
The Importance of Being Earnest (1952)
Little Big Shot (1952)
Made in Heaven (1952)
Miss Robin Hood (1952)
Mother Riley Meets the Vampire (1952)
My Wife's Lodger (1952)
Penny Princess (1952)
The Pickwick Papers (1952)
Song of Paris (1952)
Time Gentlemen, Please! (1952)
Treasure Hunt (1952)
Who Goes There! (1952)
You're Only Young Twice (1952)
A Day to Remember (1953)
Always a Bride (1953)
The Captain's Paradise (1953)
The Final Test (1953) 
Folly to Be Wise (1953)
Forces' Sweetheart (1953)
Genevieve (1953)
The Great Game (1953)
Innocents in Paris (1953)
Is Your Honeymoon Really Necessary? (1953) 
Isn't Life Wonderful! (1953) 
It's a Grand Life (1953)
Laxdale Hall (1953)
Love in Pawn (1953)
The Oracle (1953)
Our Girl Friday (1953)
Those People Next Door (1953) 
The Titfield Thunderbolt (1953)
Top of the Form (1953) 
Trouble in Store (1953)
Valley of Song (1953) 
Will Any Gentleman...? (1953)
The Angel Who Pawned Her Harp (1954) 
Aunt Clara (1954) 
The Beachcomber (1954) 
The Belles of St. Trinian's (1954)
Calling All Cars (1954)
The Crowded Day (1954)
Doctor in the House (1954)
Fast and Loose (1954)
Father Brown (1954) 
For Better, for Worse (1954)
The Gay Dog (1954)
Happy Ever After (1954)
Hobson's Choice (1954)
Life with the Lyons (1954)
Lilacs in the Spring (1954)
The Love Lottery (1954) 
Mad About Men (1954) 
Make Me an Offer (1954)
The Maggie (1954)
The Million Pound Note (1954)
Orders Are Orders (1954)
The Runaway Bus (1954)
To Dorothy a Son (1954) 
Trouble in the Glen (1954)
Up to His Neck (1954)
You Know What Sailors Are (1954)
A Yank in Ermine (1955) 
All for Mary (1955)
An Alligator Named Daisy (1955)
The Constant Husband (1955) 
Doctor at Sea (1955)
Fun at St. Fanny's (1955)
Geordie (1955)
I Am a Camera (1955) 
It's a Great Day (1955)
John and Julie (1955)
Josephine and Men (1955)
The Ladykillers (1955)
The Love Match (1955)
The Lyons in Paris (1955)
Man of the Moment (1955)
The Man Who Loved Redheads (1955)
Miss Tulip Stays the Night (1955)
No Smoking (1955)
One Good Turn (1955)
Simon and Laura (1955)
The Time of His Life (1955)
To Paris with Love (1955)
Touch and Go (1955)
Value for Money (1955)
Where There's a Will (1955)
You Lucky People (1955)
A Touch of the Sun (1956)
The Baby and the Battleship (1956) 
The Case of the Mukkinese Battle-Horn (1956)
Dry Rot (1956)
The Extra Day (1956)
The Green Man (1956)
The Iron Petticoat (1956)
It's a Wonderful World (1956)
It's Great to Be Young (1956)
It's Never Too Late (1956)
Jumping for Joy (1956)
Keep It Clean (1956)
Loser Takes All (1956)
The March Hare (1956) 
Not So Dusty (1956)
Private's Progress (1956)
Ramsbottom Rides Again (1956)
Sailor Beware! (1956)
Smiley (1956)
Three Men in a Boat (1956)
Tons of Trouble (1956)
Up in the World (1956)
Who Done It? (1956)
The Admirable Crichton (1957) 
Barnacle Bill (1957)
Blue Murder at St Trinian's (1957)
Brothers in Law (1957)
Carry On Admiral (1957) (not part of the Carry On series)
Doctor at Large (1957)
The Good Companions (1957)
Just My Luck (1957)
Let's Be Happy (1957)
Lucky Jim (1957)
The Naked Truth (1957)
Not Wanted on Voyage (1957)
Rockets Galore! (1957)
Small Hotel (1957)
The Smallest Show on Earth (1957)
True as a Turtle (1957)
Bachelor of Hearts (1958)
The Big Money (1958)
Carry On Sergeant (1958)
The Duke Wore Jeans (1958)
Further Up the Creek (1958)
Girls at Sea (1958) 
Happy Is the Bride (1958) 
The Horse's Mouth (1958)
I Only Arsked! (1958)
Indiscreet (1958)
Law and Disorder (1958) 
Next to No Time (1958)
Rooney (1958) 
Up the Creek (1958)
Wonderful Things! (1958)
Alive and Kicking (1959) 
Battle of the Sexes (1959)
The Bridal Path (1959)
The Captain's Table (1959)
Carlton-Browne of the F.O. (1959)
Carry On Nurse (1959)
Carry On Teacher (1959)
Desert Mice (1959)
Don't Panic Chaps! (1959)
Follow a Star (1959)
I'm All Right Jack (1959)
Idol on Parade (1959)
The Lady Is a Square (1959) 
Left Right and Centre (1959)
Make Mine a Million (1959)
The Mouse That Roared (1959)
The Navy Lark (1959)
The Night We Dropped a Clanger (1959)
Operation Bullshine (1959)
Our Man in Havana (1959)
Please Turn Over (1959)
Strictly Confidential (1959) 
The Square Peg (1959)
Too Many Crooks (1959)

1960s

A French Mistress (1960) 
And the Same to You (1960) 
Bottoms Up (1960) 
The Boy Who Stole a Million (1960) 
The Bulldog Breed (1960)
Carry On Constable (1960)
Dentist in the Chair (1960)
Doctor in Love (1960)
Follow That Horse! (1960) 
The Grass Is Greener (1960)
His and Hers (1960)
Inn for Trouble (1960)
The League of Gentlemen (1960) 
Let's Get Married (1960) 
Life Is a Circus (1960)
Light Up the Sky! (1960)
Make Mine Mink (1960)
Man in the Moon (1960) 
The Millionairess (1960)
No Kidding (1960)
Operation Cupid (1960)
The Pure Hell of St Trinian's (1960)
Sands of the Desert (1960)
School for Scoundrels (1960)
There Was a Crooked Man (1960)
Two-Way Stretch (1960)
Watch Your Stern (1960)
Your Money or Your Wife (1960) 
A Matter of WHO (1961)
A Weekend with Lulu (1961)
Carry On Regardless (1961)
Dentist on the Job (1961)
Don't Bother to Knock (1961)
Double Bunk (1961)
The Girl on the Boat (1961)
Invasion Quartet (1961)
Nearly a Nasty Accident (1961)
The Night We Got the Bird (1961)
Nothing Barred (1961)
No My Darling Daughter (1961)
On the Fiddle (1961)
Part-Time Wife (1961) 
Petticoat Pirates (1961)
Raising the Wind (1961)
The Rebel (1961)
Very Important Person (1961)
Watch it, Sailor! (1961)
What a Carve Up! (1961)
What a Whopper (1961)
A Pair of Briefs (1962)
The Amorous Prawn (1962)
Carry On Cruising (1962)
Crooks Anonymous (1962)
The Dock Brief (1962)
Go to Blazes (1962)
The Golden Rabbit (1962) 
In the Doghouse (1962)
The Iron Maiden (1962)
Mrs Gibbons' Boys (1962)
On the Beat (1962)
Only Two Can Play (1962)
Operation Snatch (1962)
The Punch and Judy Man (1962)
She'll Have to Go (1962)
Twice Round the Daffodils (1962)
We Joined the Navy (1962)
A Stitch in Time (1963)
Billy Liar (1963)
Carry On Cabby (1963)
Carry On Jack (1963)
The Cracksman (1963)
Doctor in Distress (1963)
The Fast Lady (1963) 
Father Came Too! (1963) 
Heavens Above! (1963) 
Ladies Who Do (1963)
The Mouse on the Moon (1963)
Nurse on Wheels (1963)
Strictly for the Birds (1963)
Tom Jones (1963)
Two Left Feet (1963)
The Wrong Arm of the Law (1963)
A Hard Day's Night (1964)
A Home of Your Own (1964) 
The Bargee (1964)
Carry On Cleo (1964)
Carry On Spying (1964)
Crooks in Cloisters (1964)
Dr. Strangelove (1964)
French Dressing (1964) 
Hot Enough for June (1964)
Never Put It in Writing (1964)
Nothing but the Best (1964)
One Way Pendulum (1964)
Rattle of a Simple Man (1964)
The Amorous Adventures of Moll Flanders (1965)
The Big Job (1965)
Carry On Cowboy (1965)
The Early Bird (1965)
Every Day's a Holiday (1965)
Gonks Go Beat (1965)
Help! (1965)
The Intelligence Men (1965)
Joey Boy (1965)
The Knack ...and How to Get It (1965)
Rotten to the Core (1965)
Those Magnificent Men in their Flying Machines (1965)
You Must Be Joking! (1965)
Alfie (1966)
Carry On Screaming! (1966)
Doctor in Clover (1966)
Don't Lose Your Head (1966)
The Great St Trinian's Train Robbery (1966)
Morgan! (1966)
Press for Time (1966)
The Sandwich Man (1966)
The Spy with a Cold Nose (1966)
That Riviera Touch (1966)
Where the Bullets Fly (1966)
The Wrong Box (1966)
A Countess from Hong Kong (1967)
Bedazzled (1967)
Carry On Doctor (1967)
Casino Royale (1967)
Follow That Camel (1967)
How I Won the War (1967) 
I'll Never Forget What's'isname (1967)
The Jokers (1967)
Jules Verne's Rocket to the Moon (1967)
Just like a Woman (1967) 
The Magnificent Two (1967)
The Plank (1967)
Smashing Time (1967)
Carry On Up the Khyber (1968)
Here We Go Round the Mulberry Bush (1968)
Only When I Larf (1968)
Prudence and the Pill (1968)
Till Death Us Do Part (1968)
The Assassination Bureau (1969)
The Bed Sitting Room (1969) 
The Best House in London (1969)
Carry On Again Doctor (1969)
Carry On Camping (1969)
Crooks and Coronets (1969)
The Italian Job (1969)
The Magic Christian (1969)
Otley (1969)
What's Good for the Goose (1969)

1970s

All the Way Up (1970)
The Breaking of Bumbo (1970) 
Carry On Loving (1970) 
Carry On Up the Jungle (1970) 
Cool It Carol! (1970) 
Doctor in Trouble (1970)
Entertaining Mr Sloane (1970)
Every Home Should Have One (1970)
Hoffman (1970)
Loot (1970)
Perfect Friday (1970)
The Rise and Rise of Michael Rimmer (1970) 
Simon, Simon (1970) 
Some Will, Some Won't (1970) 
Take a Girl Like You (1970)
There's a Girl in My Soup (1970)
And Now for Something Completely Different (1971)
Carry On at Your Convenience (1971)
Carry On Henry (1971) 
Dad's Army (1971)
Games That Lovers Play (1971)
Gumshoe (1971)
Melody (1971)
On the Buses (1971) 
Percy (1971)
Please Sir! (1971)
The Statue (1971) 
Suburban Wives (1971)
Up the Chastity Belt (1971)
Up Pompeii (1971)
A Day in the Death of Joe Egg (1972)
The Alf Garnett Saga (1972)
Au Pair Girls (1972)
Bless This House (1972)
Carry On Abroad (1972)
Carry On Matron (1972) 
Commuter Husbands (1972)
For the Love of Ada (1972)
Go for a Take (1972) 
Mutiny on the Buses (1972) 
Nearest and Dearest (1972)
Ooh… You Are Awful (1972)
Our Miss Fred (1972)
Pulp (1972)
Rentadick (1972)
Sex and the Other Woman (1972)
Steptoe and Son (1972) 
Sunstruck (1972)
That's Your Funeral (1972)
Up the Front (1972)
Adolf Hitler: My Part in His Downfall (1973)
The Best Pair of Legs in the Business (1973)
Carry On Girls (1973)
Don't Just Lie There, Say Something! (1973)
Father, Dear Father (1973)
Holiday on the Buses (1973) 
The House in Nightmare Park (1973)
Love Thy Neighbour (1973)
The Lovers (1973)
The National Health (1973)
Never Mind the Quality Feel the Width (1973)
No Sex Please, We're British (1973)
Not Now, Darling (1973)
Secrets of a Door-to-Door Salesman (1973)
The Sex Thief (1973)
Steptoe and Son Ride Again (1973) 
Tiffany Jones (1973)
White Cargo (1973) 
The Best of Benny Hill (1974)
Can You Keep It Up for a Week? (1974)
Carry On Dick (1974)
Confessions of a Window Cleaner (1974)
The Great McGonagall (1974)
Man About the House (1974)
Percy's Progress (1974)
Romance with a Double Bass (1974) 
Soft Beds, Hard Battles (1974)
Vampira (1974)
The Amorous Milkman (1975)
Carry On Behind (1975)
Confessions of a Pop Performer (1975)
Eskimo Nell (1975) 
Monty Python and the Holy Grail (1975)
One of Our Dinosaurs Is Missing (1975)
The Return of the Pink Panther (1975)
Adventures of a Taxi Driver (1976)
Confessions of a Driving Instructor (1976)
Keep It Up Downstairs (1976)
The Likely Lads (1976)
The Pink Panther Strikes Again (1976)
Adventures of a Private Eye (1977)
Are You Being Served? (1977)
Confessions from a Holiday Camp (1977)
Jabberwocky (1977)
Carry On Emmannuelle (1978)
Adventures of a Plumber's Mate (1978)
Monty Python's Life of Brian (1979)
The Plank (1979) — remake of the 1967 film
Porridge (1979)

1980s

George and Mildred (1980)
Rising Damp (1980)
An American Werewolf in London (1981)
Gregory's Girl (1981)
Time Bandits (1981)
The Boys in Blue (1982)
Privates on Parade (1982)
Victor/Victoria (1982)
Bullshot (1983)
Educating Rita (1983)
Local Hero (1983)
Loose Connections (1983)
The Missionary (1983)
Monty Python's The Meaning of Life (1983)
Comfort and Joy (1984)
A Private Function (1984)
Brazil (1985)
Morons from Outer Space (1985)
Restless Natives (1985)
Turtle Diary (1985)
Water (1985)
Clockwise
Car Trouble (1986)
Personal Services (1987)
Rita, Sue and Bob Too (1987)
Wish You Were Here (1987)
Withnail and I (1987)
Consuming Passions (1988)
A Fish Called Wanda (1988)
High Hopes (1988)
Jane and the Lost City (1988)
Without a Clue (1988)
Erik the Viking (1989)
Shirley Valentine (1989)
The Tall Guy (1989)
Wilt (1989)

1990s

Nuns on the Run (1990)
The Commitments (1991)
Life Is Sweet (1991)
The Pope Must Die (1991) 
Rosencrantz & Guildenstern (1991)
Truly, Madly, Deeply (1991)
Carry On Columbus (1992)
Hear My Song (1992)
Just like a Woman (1992)
Peter's Friends (1992)
Rebecca's Daughters (1992)
Hour of the Pig (1993)
The Big Freeze (1993)
Leon the Pig Farmer (1993)
Much Ado About Nothing (1993)
Splitting Heirs (1993)
Four Weddings and a Funeral (1994)
Princess Caraboo (1994)
Widows' Peak (1994)
The Englishman Who Went Up a Hill But Came Down a Mountain (1995)
Funny Bones (1995)
Jack and Sarah (1995)
The Madness of King George (1995)
A Month by the Lake (1995)
Brassed Off (1996)
Trainspotting (1996)
Bean (1997)
Bring Me the Head of Mavis Davis (1997)
The Full Monty (1997)
Keep the Aspidistra Flying (1997)
A Life Less Ordinary (1997)
Shooting Fish (1997)
Twin Town (1997)
Little Voice (1998)
Lock, Stock and Two Smoking Barrels (1998)
Shakespeare in Love (1998)
Sliding Doors (1998)
Still Crazy (1998)
Beautiful People (1999)
East is East (1999)
Gregory's Two Girls (1999)
Guest House Paradiso (1999)
An Ideal Husband (1999)
Waking Ned Devine (1998)
Notting Hill (1999)
Plunkett and MacLeane (1999)

2000s

Billy Elliot (2000)
Chicken Run (2000)
Greenfingers (2000)
Kevin and Perry Go Large (2000)
Relative Values (2000)
Saving Grace (2000)
Snatch (2000)
Birthday Girl (2001)
Bridget Jones's Diary (2001)
Lucky Break (2001)
The Martins (2001)
The Parole Officer (2001)
About a Boy (2002)
Ali G Indahouse (2002)
Bend It Like Beckham (2002)
The Actors (2003)
Blackball (2003)
Calendar Girls (2003)
Hello Friend (2003)
Johnny English (2003)
Love Actually (2003)
S Club: Seeing Double (2003)
Bridget Jones: The Edge of Reason (2004)
Churchill: The Hollywood Years (2004)
It's All Gone Pete Tong (2004)
Sex Lives of the Potato Men (2004)
Shaun of the Dead (2004)
Stella Street: The Movie (2004)
Wimbledon (2004)
Keeping Mum (2005)
Kinky Boots (2005)
The Hitchhiker's Guide to the Galaxy (film) (2005)
The League of Gentlemen's Apocalypse (2005)
Mrs Henderson Presents (2005)
The Truth About Love (2005)
Valiant (2005)
Wallace & Gromit: The Curse of the Were-Rabbit (2005)
A Cock and Bull Story (2006)
Confetti (2006)
Driving Lessons (2006)
Love and Other Disasters (2006)
Six Bend Trap (2006)
Starter for 10 (2006)
Death at a Funeral (2007)
Fishtales (2007)
Grow Your Own (2007)
Hot Fuzz (2007)
Magicians (2007)
Mr. Bean's Holiday (2007)
Run Fatboy Run (2007)
Son of Rambow (2007)
St Trinian's (2007)
Happy-Go-Lucky (2008)
How to Lose Friends & Alienate People (2008)
RocknRolla (2008)
Three and Out (2008)
The Boat That Rocked (2009)
Bunny And The Bull (2009)
Frequently Asked Questions About Time Travel (2009)
In the Loop (2009)
Lesbian Vampire Killers (2009)
St. Trinian's 2: The Legend of Fritton's Gold (2009)

2010s

See also
 Film genre
 List of American comedy films
 List of British comedians
 List of films based on British sitcoms

References

External links
Archive Interactive: Paul Merton on Early British Comedy
 The British Film Institute in association with BT present a guide to early British comedy film by Paul Merton.

 
Comedy
Lists of comedy films